"Single" is the debut single by British singer Natasha Bedingfield. It was written by Steve Kipner, Andrew Frampton, Wayne Wilkins and Bedingfield for her debut album, Unwritten (2004), with production handled by the former three. It received a positive reception from music critics and was released as the first single in the United Kingdom in May 2004, reaching the top five in the United Kingdom. In North and Latin America, "Single" was released as Bedingfield's third single in the second quarter of 2006 (see 2006 in music). On the US Billboard Hot 100 chart, the song reached number 57.

Commercial performance
"Single" entered the UK Singles Chart on 17 May 2004 at number 3, remaining on the chart for ten weeks. The track also reached the top ten in Ireland, where it reached number 7. The single was also successful in other European countries. It reached number 16 in Norway and number 17 in Sweden. In North America, "Single" performed moderately well. The song debuted at number 72 on the Billboard Hot 100 on 24 June 2006 and reached a peak position at number 57, remaining on the chart for six weeks. It did well on pop-oriented charts, reaching number 38 on the Pop 100 and number 26 on the Top 40 Mainstream.

Music video

The music video for "Single" was directed by Jake Nava and premiered on 26 March 2004 in the United Kingdom. The video features four sequences. It begins with Bedingfield waking up and getting ready to go out. She is then shown walking down the street past various shops, stopping at a photo booth to take photographs with a guy she had met on the street. Dressed in jeans and a silver jacket, she is next shown performing a choreographed dance with three female dancers in a tunnel. The final sequence of the video features Bedingfield at a party sitting outside on a patio, singing to herself. As the video concludes, she is shown staring at the camera as her image gradually fades.

In North America, a slightly different music video was released. The North American version featured extended photo booth and party scenes. The guy who Bedingfield meets at the photo booth is featured more prominently in the video, with Bedingfield singing the song to him. The music video, as well as behind-the-scenes footage, was released commercially on the song's CD single.

Track listings and formats
Australian maxi CD single
 "Single" – 3:57
 "Single" (Delinquents "Right Now" Refix) – 5:03
 "Single" (Martijn ten Velden & Mark Knight Future Funk remix) – 7:44
 "Single" (music video)
 Picture gallery

UK CD single
 "Single" – 3:57
 "Single" (K-Gee remix) – 3:44

Personnel
Personnel are lifted from the Unwritten liner notes.
 Natasha Bedingfield – lead and backing vocals
 Wayne Wilkins – keyboards, engineering, programming
 Kate Jeynes – keyboards, engineering, programming
 Andrew Frampton – keyboards
 Mark "Spike" Stent – mixing
 David Treahearn – mixing assistant
 Rob Haggart – mixing assistant
 Herb Powers – mastering
 Sarah Powell – guitar

Charts

Weekly charts

Year-end charts

Release history

References

2004 songs
2004 debut singles
2006 singles
Music videos directed by Jake Nava
Natasha Bedingfield songs
Phonogenic Records singles
Songs written by Andrew Frampton (songwriter)
Songs written by Natasha Bedingfield
Songs written by Steve Kipner
Songs written by Wayne Wilkins